Martin Semmelrogge (born 8 December 1955) is a German actor, best known for his role as the comical Second Watch Officer in the film Das Boot.  His character was based on the real life World War II submarine officer Werner Herrmann. 

Semmelrogge is the brother of former actor Joachim Bernhard, who appeared in Das Boot as the religious sailor.

Like many of his Das Boot co-stars, Semmelrogge went on to have a successful career in the German cinema.

Filmography

 Tadellöser & Wolff (1975, TV miniseries), as Robert Kempowski
 Derrick - Season 4, Episode 1: "Yellow He" (1977, TV), as Alfred "Ali" Rabes
  (1977, TV film), as Egon
 Derrick - Season 5, Episode 12: "Ute und Manuela" (1978, TV), as Hansi Stroppe
 Derrick - Season 8, Episode 8: "Prozente" (1981, TV), as Richard Siebert
 Das Boot (1981), as 2nd Lieutenant - 2WO
 Gib Gas – Ich will Spass (1983), as Andy Eckelmann (voice, uncredited)
 The Old Fox - Von Mord war nicht die Rede (1984) as Fritz Happner/Der Fuchs
  (1984), as Bizeps
 Lichtschlag (1989), as Lichtschlag
 Justice (1993), as Lucky
 Schindler's List (1993), as SS Waffen Man
 Anna Maria – Eine Frau geht ihren Weg (1994–1997, TV series), as Josef Hauser
 Die Straßen von Berlin (1995–2000, TV series), as Jockel Pietsch
 Karakum (1994), as Brink
  (1996), as Shorty (voice, uncredited)
 Life Is a Bluff (1996), as Heinzi
 Road to Palermo (1998), as Porsche Driver
 Bang Boom Bang (1999), as Schlucke
 Tower of the Firstborn (1999, TV film), as Geroq
  (2000), as Franz
 Sumo Bruno (2000), as Ecki
  (2000), as Bruno
 Hostile Takeover (2001), as Beckmann
 Ein göttlicher Job (2001), as Kruse
 Girl (2001)
 Monsters, Inc. (2001), as Randall Boggs (German version)
 Paule und Julia (2002), as Walter
 4 Freunde und 4 Pfoten (2003), as Franz Bommer
 Agnes and His Brothers (2004), as Manni Moneto
 Ludgers Fall (2006), as Kurier
 Neues vom Wixxer (2007), as Der scharfe Eddie
 Hardcover (2008), as Dealer
 Check It Out (2008), as Zahnarzt
  (2009), as Minigolfplatzbesitzer
 Chaostage (2009), as Jan Kullmann
 Kopf oder Zahl (2009), as Eule
 Zeiten ändern dich (2010), as Tätowierer
 Kalte Karibik (2010), as Kurier
 Fahr zur Hölle (2011), as Teufel
 Breakdown Forest - Reise in den Abgrund (2016), as Eyck Rhoder
  (2016), as Kumpel

References

Further reading
Martin und Sonja Semmelrogge: Das Leben ist eine Achterbahn, Langen: Müller 2006, .

External links

Waldorf school alumni
1955 births
Living people
German male television actors
German male film actors
20th-century German male actors
21st-century German male actors
People from Göppingen (district)